NA-262 Quetta-I is a newly-created a constituency for the National Assembly of Pakistan. It mainly comprises the Kuchlak Tehsil and Saddar Tehsil of Quetta district.

Assembly Segments

Members of Parliament

2018-2022: NA-264 Quetta-I

Election 2018

General elections were held on 25 July 2018.

See also
 NA-261 Mastung-cum-Surab-cum-Kalat
NA-263 Quetta-II

References 

Quetta